This is a list of telephone area codes in the state of Missouri.314/557: St. Louis and many of its immediate suburbs417: The southwestern quarter of Missouri, including Springfield, Joplin and Branson573: Eastern and Southeastern Missouri excluding the St. Louis area but including Columbia, Jefferson City, Rolla, Cape Girardeau, Perryville  and Hannibal636: Greater St. Louis area, including St. Charles, Jefferson, and western St. Louis counties; forms a ring surrounding the immediate St. Louis area (314)660: Northern and Western Missouri excluding the Kansas City and St. Joseph metropolitan areas, but including Sedalia, Kirksville, Warrensburg and Maryville816: The Kansas City''' and St. Joseph metropolitan areas

History
The two original area codes for Missouri in 1947 were 314 and 816.  Area code 417 was split off from 816 in 1950, and the other area codes followed more than 40 years later, due to the proliferation of Cellular Phones and Pagers.

External links

 
Missouri
Area codes